narrow-gauge railways are generally found in Europe. This gauge is mostly used for light urban rail networks, industrial and agricultural railways.

Railways

In Sweden, there was an extensive network of railways with  track, some of them remain. This close enough to  that they are more or less compatible, and some sales of rolling stock between the gauges have taken place.

See also

List of track gauges